Turn It Down may refer to:

"Turn It Down", song by Kaskade from Fire & Ice
"Turn It Down", song by Sweet from Desolation Boulevard
"Turn It Down", song by the Orb from Cydonia